Holy Trinity Church is a Roman Catholic Parish church in Chipping Norton, Oxfordshire, England. It is situated on the London road in the centre of the town. It was built in 1836 and is a Grade II listed building.

History
It was built in 1836, seven years after the Roman Catholic Relief Act of 1829, and fourteen years before the Restoration of the English hierarchy in 1850. As there were no dioceses in England at the time, the church came under the administration of the Vicar Apostolic of the Midland District. It was built in a classical revival style of architecture, similar to Chipping Norton Town Hall.

From 1922 until 1969, Heythrop Park, a country house in the parish, was occupied by the Society of Jesus. During that time, Heythrop Hall was a philosophy and theology college for those studying to become Jesuits. While they were there, the Jesuits also staffed Holy Trinity church. After they left, the church reverted to the care of the Archdiocese of Birmingham, who continue to serve the parish.

In March 2009, Bishop Mark Jabalé, the emeritus Bishop of Menevia and former abbot of Belmont Abbey was made the parish priest.

Architecture
The church is made of rubble stone at the rear side and ashlar to the other sides. There are three round headed windows on either side of the nave of the church. There is a gallery in the west part of the church and a stained glass window behind the altar made in 1873. There are two doorways on the side of the church facing the road, above them are bays in the façade. Above the bays and the windows is a coved cornice. There are porches projecting out at either side with antae, sunburst shells and ammonite scrolls in the stonework.

Parish
There are two Sunday Masses held in the church, one is on Saturday evening at 6:00pm and the other is at 11am Sunday morning. The church has a relationship with the nearby Holy Trinity Catholic School.

Interior

See also
 Chipping Norton
 Heythrop Park

References

External links

 Holy Trinity Church, Chipping Norton from the Archdiocese of Birmingham
 Holy Trinity Catholic School site

Grade II listed churches in Oxfordshire
Roman Catholic churches in Oxfordshire
Romanesque Revival church buildings in England
Roman Catholic churches completed in 1836
Grade II listed Roman Catholic churches in England
19th-century Roman Catholic church buildings in the United Kingdom
1836 establishments in England
Holy Trinity